Ghaziabad is a city in the Indian state  of Uttar Pradesh and a part of Delhi NCR. It is the administrative headquarters of Ghaziabad district and is the largest city in western Uttar Pradesh, with a population of 1,729,000. Ghaziabad Municipal Corporation is divided into 5 zones - City Zone, Kavi Nagar Zone, Vijay Nagar Zone, Mohan Nagar Zone and Vasundhara Zone. The Municipal Corporation comprises 100 wards. Well connected by roads and railways, it is a major rail junction for North India.

It is sometimes referred to as the "Saya of Uttar Pradesh" because it is close to New Delhi, on the main route into Uttar Pradesh. Recent construction works have led to the city being described by a City Mayors Foundation survey as the second fastest-growing in the world. Situated in the Upper Gangetic Plains, the city has two major divisions separated by the Hindon River, namely Trans-Hindon on the west and Cis-Hindon on the east.

History
The city of Ghaziabad was founded in 1740 A.D. by Ghazi-ud-Din, who served as a wazir in the court of Mughal emperor Muhammad Shah, and named it as "Ghaziuddinnagar" after his own name. The name "Ghaziuddinnagar" was shortened to its present form, i.e. "Ghaziabad" with the opening of the Railways in 1864. During the Mughal period, Ghaziabad and especially the banks of the Hindon in Ghaziabad, remained a picnic spot for the Mughal royal family.

Establishment of the Scientific Society here, during the same period is considered as a milestone of the educational movement launched by Syed Ahmad Khan. The Scinde, Punjab & Delhi Railway, connecting Delhi and Lahore, up until Ambala through Ghaziabad was opened in the same year. With the completion of the Amritsar-Saharanpur-Ghaziabad line of the Sind, Punjab and Delhi Railway in 1870, Delhi was connected to Multan through Ghaziabad, and Ghaziabad became the junction of the East Indian Railway and Sind, Punjab and Delhi Railway.

Ghaziabad, along with Meerut and Bulandshahr, remained one of the three Munsifis of the District, under the Meerut Civil Judgeship during most periods of the British Raj.

Ghaziabad was associated with the Indian independence movement from the Indian Rebellion of 1857.

Economy 

Although connected by railway since 1865, it was not until 1940 that the first modern industry appeared in Ghaziabad. However, it was in the post-independence period that industry really expanded, with a further 22 factories opening in the four years after 1947. This development can be attributed to the influx of people from the newly formed Pakistan and the relocation of businesses from what was now the Pakistani province of Punjab. John Oakey and Mohan Ltd., one of India's largest concerns manufacturing coated and bonded abrasives, and originally functioning under the name of 'National Abrasives' at Rawalpindi was shifted here under the proprietorship of 'Dyer Meakins' in 1947. Subsequently, the Mohan Meakin breweries were also set up in the year 1949. This period also saw the development of Ghaziabad as one of India's most famous centres of the Oil Engines industry.

In 1967, the municipal limits were extended up to the Delhi-UP border. Starting in the early 1970s, many steel-manufacturing units also came up in the city making it one of the primary industries of the city. This period also saw the emergence of the Electronics industry, with the setting up of Bharat Electronics Limited and Central Electronics Limited Over the years, planned Industrial development saw participation from major industrial houses of the country including Mohans (Mohan Nagar Industrial Estate, 1949), Tatas (Tata Oil Mills), Modis (Modinagar, 1933; International Tobacco Co. 1967), Shri Rams (Shri Ram Pistons, 1964), Jaipurias etc. and also significant participation through foreign capital in concerns such as Danfoss India Ltd. (estd. 1968); Indo- Bulgar Food Ltd. and International Tobacco Company (estd. 1967).

Demographics

Population
The provisional data derived from the 2011 census shows that Ghaziabad urban agglomeration had a population of 2,358,525, of which males were 1,256,783 and females were 1,101,742. The literacy rate was 93.81%. Ghaziabad is a subcategory B1 district of category B i.e. having socioeconomic parameters below the national average. It is the second largest industrial city in Uttar Pradesh after Kanpur.

Government and politics 
Ghaziabad city is governed by the Ghaziabad Municipal Corporation under the Uttar Pradesh Municipal Corporation Act, 1959. It upgraded from a Municipal Board to a Municipal Corporation on 31 August 1994, following the 74th Constitutional Amendment Act. Ghaziabad Municipal Corporation (or Nagar Nigam Ghaziabad) is divided into 5 zones - City Zone, Kavi Nagar Zone, Vijay Nagar Zone, Mohan Nagar Zone and Vasundhara Zone. The Municipal Corporation comprises 100 wards, with councillors elected from each ward. The local elections to all wards was last held in 2017. The executive head is Mahendra Singh Tanwar, the current Municipal Commissioner while the elected head is the Mayor, Asha Sharma from the BJP.
In 2022, Assembly Election Atul Garg, Bhartiya Janta Party candidate won the election.

The municipality has the following departments: Swachh Bharat Mission, Public Works Dept, I.T Dept, Property Tax Dept, Health Dept, Street Light Dept, Water Works Dept, Law, Garden/Horticulture. It has an executive committee composed of businessmen.

Representation in state assembly 
The city is represented in the Lok Sabha through one MP elected from the Lok Sabha constituency represented by Gen. (Retd.) Vijay Kumar Singh from the BJP, and one MLA elected from the Vidhan Sabha constituency, represented by BJP's Atul Garg elected in 2017.

Law and order 
In January 2020 it was announced that the police commissionerate system was likely to be introduced in Ghaziabad in phases. The city police is under the state home department and is headed by Senior Superintendent of Police for the district.

Development 
The Ghaziabad Development Authority (GDA), established 1977, is responsible for planning, development and construction of housing projects, commercial lands, land management and infrastructure.

Civic utilities 
Nagar Nigam Ghaziabad looks after the civic activities of the city. Other development agencies of the city include the Ghaziabad Development Authority, and the UP Jal Nigam. The master plan for the city is laid by the Town & Country Planning Department, Uttar Pradesh, which is department under the Department of Housing and Urban Planning for the state.

The corporation supplies water and has nearly 2.35 lakh water connections, supplying nearly 388 MLD of water per day. The city also receives water from the Ganga through 50 cusec (one cubic foot of water flow per second which translates into 28.32 litres) and 100 cusec plants  but a lot of areas in the city constituting multi-storied apartments do not receive Ganga water and rely on groundwater. Treated water is supplied to only 36.2% of households.

The municipality, as well as UP Jal Nigam sets up sewage treatment plants and water treatment plants for the city.  The Ghaziabad Development Authority is responsible for laying networks of sewer lines and piped drinking water supply. Drinking water remains a concern with 55.6% of households accessing it from tube wells, bore wells and hand pumps. Only 30.5% households are connected to piped sewer lines.

As of 2019, Ghaziabad generates 1,000 metric tonnes of waste daily, some of which is sent to Meerut, while 300 metric tonnes are sent to Pilkhuwa, while almost 200 metric tons is used in various GMC owned parks to create compost. The corporation also dumps garbage in Indirapuram landfill site, and would dump it in Pratap Vihar landfill until they stopped on the orders of a National Green Tribunal committee. The corporation also announced in September 2020 that it was creating 10 'garbage factories' as a permanent solution to the city's waste problem.

Transportation

Road

A proposal has been made to widen National Highway 24 (NH-24) from four to fourteen lanes on the stretch between the Ghaziabad-Delhi border and Dasna. Many residential and commercial projects are being built along the highway.

Rail

The Blue and Red Lines of the Delhi Metro serve Ghaziabad and connect it with the national capital, Delhi. The Red Line serves Ghaziabad, with eight stations, and Blue Line with two stations. The Red Line's eastern terminus, Shaheed Sthal, is located in this city. Other stations include Hindon River (which serves Raj Nagar Extension) and Mohan Nagar. The Blue Line stations exist at Vaishali which serves that area as well as Vasundhara and Indirapuram, and Kaushambi Station serving the Kaushambi area.

The city receives Indian Railways service at Ghaziabad Junction. This is one of the major junctions in the country and has been operating since 1864, being one of the first few stations opened.

The Delhi–Meerut RRTS is currently under construction and will run through Ghaziabad.

Air
Hindon Airport is an airport serving Ghaziabad and has been operational since 2019. It is the second commercial airport in the Delhi–NCR after Indira Gandhi International Airport. The airport was inaugurated by the Prime Minister of India Narendra Modi on 8 March 2019. The Indira Gandhi International Airport is the closest international airport. Hindon Airport currently operates flights to Pithoragarh, Uttarakhand, and Hubli, Karnataka.

Institutes
Ghaziabad has also emerged as one of the major educational destinations with many higher education colleges and institutes operating in the city. Some of the main institutes are:-
 
 
IMS Engineering College
Institute of Management Technology (IMT)
Institute of Technology and Science, Mohan Nagar, Ghaziabad
Raj Kumar Goel Institute of Technology
Santosh Medical College
SRM Institute of Science and Technology (Delhi-NCR Campus)

Notable people

Arts, entertainment and television
 
 
 Lara Dutta, Miss Universe 2000 and Bollywood actress.

Business
 
 
 Nikesh Arora, businessman, former president and COO of SoftBank Corp. and CEO of SoftBank Internet and Media, Inc. 
 Kapil Mohan, businessman

Politics and government
 
 
 Suresh Bansal, politician
 Madan Bhaiya, politician,
 Roop Chaudhary, politician.         
 Arvind Kejriwal, politician
 Rama Pilot, politician.
 General V.K. Singh (Retd.), politician
 K.C. Tyagi, politician
 Ram Chandra Vikal, freedom fighter and deputy Chief Minister of UP.

Sports
 

Rajkumar Baisla, Dhayanchand Awardee 2011 (Wrestling)
Manoj Prabhakar, cricketer
Suresh Raina, cricketer

References

Further reading

External links

 Ghaziabad District Administration
 

Ghaziabad, Uttar Pradesh
Cities in Uttar Pradesh
Metropolitan cities in India